S. australis may refer to:
 Sauromalus australis, the Peninsular chuckwalla, a lizard species found in Mexico
 Schenkia australis, an annual herb species endemic to Australia
 Scolypopa australis, the passionvine hopper, an insect species found in Australia
 Scytothamnus australis, a brown alga species found in New Zealand
 Sloanea australis, the maiden's blush, a rainforest tree species found in Australia
 Smilax australis, the lawyer vine, barbwire vine or "wait-a-while", a plant species endemic to Australia
 Soroavisaurus australis, an enantiornithine bird species that lived during the Late Cretaceous of Argentina
 Suaeda australis, the Austral seablite, a plant species native to Australia
 Syconycteris australis, the Common Blossom Bat, Southern Blossom Bat or Queensland Blossom Bat, a fruit bat species

See also 
 Australis (disambiguation)